is a town in Nord-Aurdal Municipality in Innlandet county, Norway. The town is the administrative centre of the municipality as well as the largest urban/commercial centre for the Valdres region.

Fagernes lies approximately 3 hours northwest of the capital city of Oslo, and is an important destination for tourism in Norway, due to good transportation connections and the nature in the surrounding Valdres valley, including the mountain areas such as Jotunheimen and Spåtind. The European route E16 highway runs through the town. The Strondafjorden lake lies on the south side of the town. Tingnes Church is located in the town.

History
On 14 June 2007 the municipal council of Nord-Aurdal decided to bestow town status on the large village of Fagernes. The decision came into force on 8 September 2007, when Fagernes celebrated the 150th anniversary of its establishment as a village.

Name
Fagernes is a compound word made up of fager which means "fair" or "beautiful" and nes which means "headland".

Climate
Fagernes has a boreal climate (subarctic), but is quite close to a humid continental climate. February–April is the driest season, while summer is the wettest. The all-time low  was recorded January 1987, and the all-time high  was recorded in both July 2014 and August 1982. The average date for first overnight freeze (below ) in autumn is 25 September (1981-2010 average).

See also
List of towns and cities in Norway

References

External links 
Fagernes in pictures
Fagernes Webcam
Fagernes tourist office
Fagernes in pictures at YouTube

Cities and towns in Norway
Populated places in Innlandet
Valdres
Nord-Aurdal
2007 establishments in Norway